List of works by or about Timothy Ferris, American science writer.

Books

Articles and essays
"Timothy Ferris on Voyagers' Never-Ending Journey," Smithsonian magazine, May 2012.
“Sun Struck,” a piece on the solar storms (solar flares) National Geographic, June 2012.
“Dancing in the Dark,” National Geographic, December 2011.
“The World of the Intellectual vs. The World of the Engineer,” Wired.com, October 13, 2011.
"Why I Write: Timothy Ferris on Writing to Learn", National Writing Project September 23, 2011.
"An Experiment in Reason: True Liberalism is a proposition, not a dogma," Oxford American, Issue 70, 2010.
"Worlds Apart: Seeking New Earths", National Geographic, December 2009, pg 78.
“Raising Heaven,” National Geographic, November 2007.
“Seeing in the Dark,” HighDef magazine, Sept/Oct 2007.
“Mix Tape of the Gods,” The New York Times Op-Ed page, September 5, 2007.
 Liner notes for the music album “Private Investigations – The Very Best of Dire Straits and Mark Knopfler”, November 2005.
“Sedan Delivery,” Automobile, July 2005.
 Foreword to Michelle Feynman, ed., Perfectly Reasonable Deviations from the Beaten Track: The Letters of Richard P. Feynman. New York:  Basic Books, 2005.
 “C6 Appeal,” Automobile, September 2004.
 “The Waiting Game,” Automobile, April 2004.
 Foreword to Field Guide for Science Writers, 2004.
 Foreword to Hunter S. Thompson’s Kingdom of Fear.  New York:  Simon & Schuster, 2003.
 “A New Pathway to the Stars,” The New York Times Op-Ed page, Sunday, December 21, 2003; reprinted in the International Herald Tribune and the Long Beach Press-Telegram.
 “The Wonder of Seeing Red,” Los Angeles Times Opinion page, August 24, 2003.
 “’Taken’ Off,” Skeptical Inquirer, March/April 2003.
 “At Dawn, the Columbia,” The New York Times Op-Ed page, February 3, 2003, and other newspapers.
 “The Whole Shebang:  How Science Produced the Big Bang Model,” from The Whole Shebang, American Educator, Fall 2002.
 “Killer Rocks From Outer Space,” adapted from Seeing in the Dark, Reader’s Digest, October 2002.
 “Voyager:  A Message From Earth,” The Planetary Report, September/October 2002.
 “Astronomy’s New Stars,” from Seeing in the Dark, Smithsonian, September 2002; reprinted in The Best American Science And Nature Writing 2003.
 “On Science Writing,” Physics in Perspective, vol. 4 (2002) 1, 3–12, February 2002.
 Foreword to James Trefil and Margaret Hindle Hazen, Good Seeing:  A Century of Science at the Carnegie Institution of Washington 1902–2002.  Washington, Joseph Henry Press, 2002.
 “Infinite Loop,” Yahoo Internet Life, September 2001.
 Introduction to Celestial Nights:  Visions of an Ancient Land, by Neil Folberg.  New York, Aperture, 2001.
 “Snafu Snared, Scientists Say,” ScienceWriters, Spring 2001.
 “Concerning John Archibald Wheeler,” Contentville.com, February 2001.
 “Reforming Voting Machine Technology,” Contentville.com, January 2001.
 “Five Gs and a 125-Pound Head,” Men's Journal, January 2001.
 “Stars and Pyramids,” Contentville.com, December 2000.
 “Bush and Gore on Science and Technology,” Contentville.com, October 2000.
 “Many Questions, Some Answers,” Forbes ASAP, October 2, 2000.
 “Faster Than a Speeding Unser,” Men's Journal, September 2000.
 Contributions to “What Are the Grand Questions of Science?” and “What Are the Next Breakthroughs in Science?” in Robert Lawrence Kuhn, editor, Closer to Truth.  New York:  McGraw Hill, 2000.
 “The Sinking of the Kursk,” Contentville.com, September 1, 2000.
 “Precious Metal,” Automobile, September 2000.
 “Switching the Light Fantastic,” Forbes ASAP, August 21, 2000.
 “Where Are They?” Contentville.com, August 1, 2000.
 “On Stargazing,” Contentville.com, July 25, 2000.
 “How Will the Universe End?  Time, April 10, 2000.
The Light and the Dark, Automobile, March 2000.
A Space Station? The New York Times Magazine, November 28, 1999. Reprinted in MAX Magazine, Germany, 1999.
If Forced to Choose, American Scientist, November–December 1999.
The Cruel Sport, Talk, November 1999.
The Last Bit: Is Information Theory the Answer to Everything? Forbes ASAP Big Issue IV, October 4, 1999.
Personal Places, National Geographic Traveler, October 1999.
How to Predict Everything, The New Yorker, July 12, 1999.
Introduction to The Scientific American Book of Astronomy, The Lyons Press, 1999.
Whine of the Region: If You Want to Know Why a Ferrari is a Ferrari, Just Drive One in its Homeland, Automobile, July 1999.
Interstellar Spaceflight, Scientific American Presents: The Future of Space Exploration, Spring 1999.
Communication With High-Performance Automobiles, Wired, January 1999.
NASA’s Mission to Nowhere, Op-ed page, The New York Times, Sunday, November 29, 1998.
The Three Immensities, Forbes ASAP Big Issue III, November 30, 1998.
Seeing in the Dark, The New Yorker, August 10, 1998.
Not Rocket Science, The New Yorker, July 20, 1998.
Flight of the Bumblers, Op-ed page, The New York Times, September 24, 1997.
The Space Gamble, The New York Review of Books, September 25, 1997; reprinted in Le Recherche, Paris, November 1997.
Inflating the Cosmos, Astronomy, July 1997.
The Wrong Stuff, The New Yorker, April 14, 1997.
The Risks and Rewards of Popularizing Science, The Chronicle of Higher Education, April 4, 1997; reprinted in The Informal Science Review, May/June 1997.
The Moon's Big Splash, Natural History, March 1997.
Is This the End? The New Yorker, January 27, 1997; reprinted in Germany and Australia and in McGraw-Hill=s Quantitative Reasoning Workbook., 1997.
Weirdness Makes Sense, The New York Times Magazine, Sep 29, 1996.
A Message From Mars, The New Yorker, August 19, 1996.
Express Train of the Sky, Op-Ed page, San Francisco Examiner and other newspapers, June 4, 1996.
Foreword, Robert P. Crease and Charles C. Mann, The Second Creation: Makers of the Revolution in Twentieth-Century Physics, Rutgers University Press, 1996.
Alien Ambition, The New Yorker, February 12, 1996.
Apollo 13 and the Strip-Mining of American Culture, Newsday, July 11, 1995; reprinted in the Washington Times, Minneapolis Star Tribune, Phoenix Gazette, other papers.
At the Cosmological Conference, The New Yorker, May 15, 1995.
The Interpreter, lead essay in Ted Anton and Rick McCourt, editors, The New Science Journalists: The Future of Our Planet, Our Species, and Our Psyches, From the Most Renowned Literary Science Journalists Working Today, New York, Ballantine, 1995.
Science and Genesis, chapter in Clifford N. Matthews and Roy Abraham Varghese, editors, Cosmic Beginnings and Human Ends: Where Science and Religion Meet, Chicago, Open Court, 1995.
"Earthbound," The New Yorker,  August 1, 1994.
"Ayrton Senna's Intense, Deadly World," San Francisco Examiner Op-Ed page, Sunday, May 15, 1994.
"Seeing Stars," The New Yorker, January 31, 1994.
"Evolution of Interstellar Communications Systems," chapter in Bang:  The Evolving Cosmos:  Nobel Conference XXVII, Richard Fuller, editor, University Press of America, 1994.
"The Future is Coming," The New York Times Op-Ed page, November 12, 1993.
"Babbling Brooks and Talking Dogs," The New York Times Op-Ed page, June 8, 1993; reprinted in the San Jose Mercury News and other newspapers.
"Life, the Universe and Me," The Times, London, February 20, 1993.
"When Science is the Star,"  The New York Times, Arts & Leisure section, Sunday, August 16, 1992.
"Total," The New Yorker, July 29, 1991.
"The Space Telescope:  A Sign of Intelligent Life," The New York Times, Week in Review section, front page, Sunday, April 29, 1990.
"Zen and R. H. Blyth," The Nation, April 30, 1990.
"Grand Unification Theories," in Holcomb B. Noble, editor, Next:  The Coming Era in Science, Boston, Little, Brown, 1988.
"Where Are We Going?  Notes on the Absolute Motion of the Solar System Through Space."  Sky & Telescope, May 1987.
"The Year of the Red Lights:  Challenger, Chernobyl, the Titanic, and 'Star Wars,'" Life, January 1987.
"Albert Einstein's Annus Mirabilis," Science 84 fifth anniversary issue, November 1984; reprinted in Annual Edition:  Western Civilization, Vol. 2, 1985.
"Mind Over Matter:  The Singular Stephen Hawking," Vanity Fair, June 1984; reprinted in The Journalist, March 1985.
"The Other Einstein," Science 83, October 1983; reprinted in A Passion to Know, Allen L. Hammond, editor, New York, Scribner's, 1984.
"Beyond Newton and Einstein:  On the Frontiers of Physics," The New York Times Magazine, September 26, 1982.
"The Perfect Circle," Science Digest, July 1981.
"A Conversation With Lewis Thomas," Smithsonian, April 1980.
"Navigators Who Probe the Mysteries of Deep Space," The New York Times Magazine, April l, 1979; reprinted in Science of the Times 3, New York, Arno Press, 1979.
"Crucibles of the Cosmos," The New York Times Magazine, January 14, 1979; New York Times Syndicate, 1979; reprinted in Reader's Digest, May 1979; Science of the Times 3, 1979; The Living World of Nature, Reader's Digest Press, 1980.
"Seeking an End to Cosmic Loneliness," The New York Times Magazine, October 23, 1977; reprinted in Science of the Times 2, 1979.
"The Odyssey and the Ecstasy:  The Viking's Search for Life on Mars," Rolling Stone, April 7, 1977; reprinted in Rolling Stone:  The 70s, Little, Brown, 1998.
"The Universe as an Ocean of Thought," Harper's, July 1975.
"All That Glitters is not God," Rolling Stone, January 30, 1975; reprinted in Paul Scanlon, editor, Reporting: The Rolling Stone Style, New York, Anchor Press/Doubleday, 1977.
Interview with Erich von Daniken, Playboy, August 1974.
"Raquel Welch Speaks Her Mind," Rolling Stone, August 29, 1974.
"Where Does it all End?  A Debate About the Edge of the Universe," Harper's, June 1974.
"A Special Report:  Is the Free Press In Danger?"  Rolling Stone, April 26, 1973.
"How Do We Know Where We Are If We've Never Been Anywhere Else?  Cosmological Perspectives," Rolling Stone, March 15, 1973.
"A Conversation With Carl Sagan," Rolling Stone, June 7, 1973; reprinted in Tom Head, ed., Conversations With Carl Sagan, 2006.
" David Brinkley vs. Woeful Ignorance," Rolling Stone, September 14, 1972.
"Hometown Folks:  Letters from American Political Prisoners," Rolling Stone, March 16, 1972; The Rolling Stone Reader, New York, Warner Library, 1974.
“Robert Johnson,” Rolling Stone, February 4, 1971.
“An Evening With Muhammad Ali,” New York Post, March 22, 1971.
"Turning Off the Sun," New York Post Magazine, March 7, 1970.
"Mars: Can It Sustain Life?" New York Post Magazine, July 23, 1969.

Notes

Bibliographies by writer
Bibliographies of American writers